Group 10, numbered by current IUPAC style, is the group of chemical elements in the periodic table that consists of nickel (Ni), palladium (Pd), platinum (Pt), and darmstadtium (Ds). All are d-block transition metals. All known isotopes of darmstadtium are radioactive with short half-lives, and are not known to occur in nature; only minute quantities have been synthesized in laboratories.

Characteristics

Chemical properties 

The ground state electronic configurations of palladium and platinum are exceptions to Madelung's rule. According to Madelung's rule, the electronic configuration of palladium and platinum are expected to be [Kr] 5s2 4d8 and [Xe] 4f14 6d2 5d8 respectively. However, the 5s orbital of palladium is empty, and the 6s orbital of platinum is only partially filled. The relativistic stabilization of the 7s orbital is the explanation to the predicted electron configuration of darmstadtium, which, unusually for this group, conforms to that predicted by the Aufbau principle. In general, the ground state electronic configurations of heavier atoms and transition metals are more difficult to predict.

Group 10 elements are observed in oxidation states of +1 to +4. The +2 oxidation state is common for nickel and palladium, while +2 and +4 are common for platinum. Oxidation states of -2 and -1 have also been observed for nickel and platinum, and an oxidation state of +5 has been observed for palladium and platinum. Platinum has also been observed in oxidations states of -3 and +6. Theory suggests that platinum may produce a +10 oxidation state under specific conditions, but this remains to be shown empirically.

Physical properties 

Darmstadtium has not been isolated in pure form, and its properties have not been conclusively observed; only nickel, palladium, and platinum have had their properties experimentally confirmed. Nickel, platinum, and palladium are typically silvery-white transition metals, and can also be readily obtained in powdered form. They are hard, have a high luster, and are highly ductile. Group 10 elements are resistant to tarnish (oxidation) at STP, are refractory, and have high melting and boiling points.

Occurrence and production
Nickel occurs naturally in ores, and it is the earth's 22nd most abundant element. Two prominent groups of ores from which it can be extracted are laterites and sulfide ores.  Indonesia holds the world's largest nickel reserve, and is also its largest producer.

History

Discoveries of the elements

Nickel 
The use of nickel, often mistaken for copper, dates as far back as 3500 BCE. Nickel has been discovered in a dagger dating to 3100 BCE, in Egyptian iron beads, a bronze reamer found in Syria dating to 3500–3100 BCE, as copper-nickel alloys in coins minted in Bactria, in weapons and pots near the Senegal river, and as agricultural tools used by Mexicans in the 1700s. There is evidence to suggest that the use of nickel in antiquity came from meteoric iron, such as in the Sumerian name for iron an-bar ("fire from heaven") or in Hittite texts that describe iron's heavenly origins. Nickel was not formally named as an element until A. F. Cronstedt isolated the impure metal from "kupfernickel" (Old Nick's copper) in 1751. In 1804, J. B. Richter determined the physical properties of nickel using a purer sample, describing the metal as ductile and strong with a high melting point. The strength of nickel-steel alloys were described in 1889 and since then, nickel steels saw extensive use first for military applications and then in the development of corrosion- and heat-resistant alloys during the 20th century.

Palladium 
Palladium was isolated by William Hyde Wollaston in 1803 while he was working on refining platinum metals. Palladium was in a residue left behind after platinum was precipitated out of a solution of hydrochloric acid and nitric acid as (NH4)PtCl6. Wollaston named it after the recently discovered asteroid 2 Pallas and anonymously sold small samples of the metal to a shop, which advertised it as a "new noble metal" called "Palladium, or New Silver". This raised doubts about its purity, source, and the identity of its discoverer, causing controversy. He eventually identified himself and read his paper on the discovery of palladium to the Royal Society in 1805.

Platinum 
Prior to its formal discovery, platinum was used in jewelry by native Ecuadorians of the province of Esmeraldas. The metal was found in small grains mixed with gold in river deposits, which the workers sintered with gold to form small trinkets such as rings. The first published report of platinum was written by Antonio de Ulloa, a Spanish mathematician, astronomer, and naval officer who observed "platina" (little silver) in the gold mines of Ecuador during a French expedition in 1736. Miners found the "platina" difficult to separate from gold, leading to the abandonment of those mines. Charles Wood (ironmaster) brought samples of the metal to England in 1741 and investigated its properties, observing its high melting point and its presence as small white grains in black metallic sand. Interest in the metal grew after Wood's findings were reported to the Royal Society. Henrik Teofilus Scheffer, a Swedish scientist, referred to the precious metal as "white gold" and the "seventh metal" in 1751, reporting its high durability, high density, and that it melted easily when mixed with copper or arsenic. Both Pierre-François Chabaneau (during the 1780s) and William Hyde Wollaston (during the 1800s) developed a powder metallurgy technique to produce malleable platinum, but kept their process a secret. However, their platinum ingots were brittle and tended to crack easily, likely due to impurities. In the 1800s, furnaces capable of sustaining high temperatures were invented, which eventually replaced powder metallurgy and introduced melted platinum to the market.

Applications
The group 10 metals share several uses.  These include:
 Decorative purposes, in the form of jewelry and electroplating.
 Catalysts in a variety of chemical reactions.
 Metal alloys.
 Electrical components, due to their predictable changes in electrical resistivity with regard to temperature.
 Superconductors, as components in alloys with other metals.

Biological role and toxicity
Platinum complexes are commonly used in chemotherapy as anticancer drugs due to their antitumor activity. Palladium complexes also show marginal antitumor activity, yet its poor activity is labile compared to platnium complexes.

See also
Platinum group

Notes and references

Groups (periodic table)